The Riverside Centre is a skyscraper designed by Harry Seidler and located at 123 Eagle Street, Brisbane, Queensland, Australia. Completed in 1986, it contains 40 storeys and rises 146 m above ground. The building is owned by General Property Trust.

The base of the building fronts the Brisbane River with a CityCat wharf, has many cafes and restaurants, and is the site for the Riverside markets on Sundays. The Riverwalk, which links the central business district to suburbs both up and down the Brisbane river was built between the water and the public space surrounding the skyscraper.

The open plaza and steps at the tower base is a recommended viewing point for the Riverfire celebrations. The building has been heritage listed and formerly held the Brisbane Stock exchange. Norman Carlberg was the sculptor who collaborated with Seidler on works for the Riverside project.

The site was initially a cemetery. It was later occupied by low level buildings attached to wharves.

Riparian Plaza, the second major building in Brisbane designed by Seidler, was completed in 2005 and is located near the Riverside Centre. One One One Eagle Street is located between the two buildings.

See also

Josef Albers (painter and influential teacher: instructor of both Seidler and Carlberg)
List of tallest buildings in Brisbane

References

Harry Seidler buildings
Skyscrapers in Brisbane
Office buildings completed in 1986
Office buildings in Brisbane
Eagle Street, Brisbane
Skyscraper office buildings in Australia